Gordon Thomson (born 5 August 1985)  is a Scottish male badminton player. He won two time Scottish National Badminton Championships men's singles event in 2007 and 2009.

Achievements

BWF International Challenge/Series
Men's Doubles

 BWF International Challenge tournament
 BWF International Series tournament
 BWF Future Series tournament

References

External links

 

1985 births
Living people
Scottish male badminton players